Naseby is a small town, formerly a borough, in the Maniototo area of Central Otago, New Zealand. It is named after a village in Northamptonshire, England. Previous names of the township were Parker's, Hogburn and Mt Ida. The town catch phrase is "2000 feet above worry level" indicating its altitude. Naseby is 395 km (5 hours drive) from Christchurch and 143 km (1 hour 45 minutes drive) from Dunedin.

An important township during the gold rush of the 1860s, Gold was discovered in the Hogburn in 1863. Much of the town has been preserved from this time and has something of the air of a working museum. At its peak, the population of the town was around 4,000 miners. Eighteen stores, 14 hotels, two butchers and a hospital had also been built to service the miners.  In 1898, a railway line was constructed 12 km away in Ranfurly and as a result services gradually moved away from Naseby to Ranfurly. By the time administrative boundaries were changed in the 1980s, it had become New Zealand's smallest borough, with a population of only around 100.  The Population swells to around 3000 during the summer holiday season.

Winters in Naseby are very harsh for New Zealand with a mean average high temperature of 6 degrees Celsius and a mean average low temperature of 0 degrees Celsius  in July.

Naseby is one of New Zealand's principal curling venues. The town also has an ice rink and New Zealand's only ice luge track (360m long).

Since 1900 Douglas fir, Larch, and Corsican pine have been planted on the former gold fields and these mature trees form the Naseby forest. Mountain biking is very popular in the forest with 52 km of tracks present. A swimming dam just above the township is a popular spot in summer and often freezes over in winter. Walking is also popular in the Naseby forest

The Mount Ida Water Race was built beginning in 1873. The water originates from the Manuherikia River. It winds its way along the Hawkdun Range, and collects water running off the streams as it flows towards Naseby. It was originally designed to feed the gold sluices.  It now provides much needed irrigation to farmers in the upper Maniototo area. A track follows the course of the race through the forest and provides pleasant mountain biking and walking opportunities.

Demographics
Ranfurly is described by Statistics New Zealand as a rural settlement. It is part of the much larger Maniototo statistical area. 

Naseby had a population of 123 at the 2018 New Zealand census, an increase of 3 people (2.5%) since the 2013 census, and an increase of 9 people (7.9%) since the 2006 census. There were 63 households. There were 69 males and 54 females, giving a sex ratio of 1.28 males per female. The median age was 55.6 years (compared with 37.4 years nationally), with 12 people (9.8%) aged under 15 years, 9 (7.3%) aged 15 to 29, 60 (48.8%) aged 30 to 64, and 42 (34.1%) aged 65 or older.

Ethnicities were 95.1% European/Pākehā, 7.3% Māori, and 4.9% other ethnicities (totals add to more than 100% since people could identify with multiple ethnicities).

Although some people objected to giving their religion, 56.1% had no religion, 24.4% were Christian and 4.9% had other religions.

Of those at least 15 years old, 12 (10.8%) people had a bachelor or higher degree, and 21 (18.9%) people had no formal qualifications. The median income was $24,800, compared with $31,800 nationally. The employment status of those at least 15 was that 45 (40.5%) people were employed full-time, and 24 (21.6%) were part-time.

Education
Naseby Public School opened in 1865 and closed in 1994. In the early 20th century it included a district high school. The nearest schools are now at Ranfurly.

In popular culture 
The cast and crew of the Jane Campion film The Power of the Dog stayed in Naseby while filming in Ida Valley in the Maniototo. Naseby was used for scenes in Goodbye Pork Pie and a Japanese film called The Promise.

Notes

Central Otago District
Populated places in Otago
Otago Gold Rush